The Mexican Petroleum Institute (in Spanish: Instituto Mexicano del Petróleo, IMP) is a public research organization dedicated to develop technical solutions, conduct basic and applied research and provide specialized training to Pemex, the state-owned government-granted monopoly in Mexico's petroleum industry.

The Institute was founded on 23 August 1965 by federal decree and is based in Mexico City. Despite facing significant budget constraints in recent years and being accused of depending excessively on foreign technology by noted physicist Leopoldo García-Colín, it was the leading patent applicant among Mexican institutions in 2005 and houses one of the most advanced microscopes on the planet.

Noted researchers

Leopoldo García-Colín: physicist laureated with the 1988 National Prize for Arts and Sciences.
Luis E. Miramontes: co-inventor of the first oral contraceptive. Laureated with the National Prize on Chemistry "Andrés Manuel del Rio" in 1986.
Octavio Novaro: recipient of the 1993 UNESCO Science Prize for his contributions to understanding catalysis phenomena.
Alexander Balankin: physicist laureated with the 2002 National Prize for Arts and Sciences and recipient of the 2005 UNESCO Science Prize for his remarkable ability to relate his research in fractal mechanics to technological applications that has provided great benefits to Mexico and worldwide.

See also

Indian Institute of Petroleum
French Institute of Petroleum
Vietnam Petroleum Institute

References

Research institutes in Mexico
Chemical research institutes
Pemex
Petroleum industry in Mexico
Research institutes established in 1965
1965 establishments in Mexico